Xyloskenea naticiformis is a species of sea snail, a marine gastropod mollusk, unassigned in the superfamily Seguenzioidea.

Description
The shell grows to a height of 2.5 mm.

Distribution
This species occurs at bathyal depths in the Northern Atlantic Ocean, in the Bay of Biscay and off Portugal

References

 Locard A., 1897–1898: Expéditions scientifiques du Travailleur et du Talisman pendant les années 1880, 1881, 1882 et 1883. Mollusques testacés.; Paris, Masson vol. 1 [1897], p. 1–516 pl. 1–22 vol. 2 [1898], p. 517–1044 pl. 23–40
 Sykes E. R., 1925: On the mollusca procured during the "Porcupine" expeditions 1869–70. Supplemental notes, part V; Proceedings of the Malacological Society of London 16: 181–193
 McLean J.H. (1992). Systematic review of the family Choristellidae (Archeogastropoda: Lepetellacea) with descriptions of new species. The Veliger 35(4): 273-294-page(s): 293
 Gofas, S.; Le Renard, J.; Bouchet, P. (2001). Mollusca, in: Costello, M.J. et al. (Ed.) (2001). European register of marine species: a check-list of the marine species in Europe and a bibliography of guides to their identification. Collection Patrimoines Naturels, 50: pp. 180–213

External links
 Warén A. (1996). New and little known mollusca from Iceland and Scandinavia. Part 3. Sarsia 81: 197–245

naticiformis
Gastropods described in 1883